Ghost in the Shell is a Japanese cyberpunk media franchise based on the seinen manga series of the same name written and illustrated by Masamune Shirow. The manga, first serialized in 1989 under the subtitle of The Ghost in the Shell, and later published as its own tankōbon volumes by Kodansha, told the story of the fictional counter-cyberterrorist organization Public Security Section 9, led by protagonist Major Motoko Kusanagi, and is set in mid-21st century Japan.

Animation studio Production I.G has produced several anime adaptations of the series. These include the 1995 film of the same name and its 2004 sequel, Ghost in the Shell 2: Innocence; the 2002 television series, Ghost in the Shell: Stand Alone Complex, and its 2020 follow-up, Ghost in the Shell: SAC_2045; and the Ghost in the Shell: Arise original video animation (OVA) series. In addition, an American-produced live-action film was released on March 31, 2017.

Overview

Title
The original editor Koichi Yuri says: At first, Ghost in the Shell came from Shirow, but when Yuri asked "something more flashy", Shirow came up with "攻殻機動隊 Koukaku Kidou Tai (Shell Squad)" for Yuri. But Shirow was attached to including "Ghost in the Shell" as well even if in smaller type.

Setting

Political intrigue and counter-terrorism operations are standard fare for Section 9, but the various actions of corrupt officials, companies, and cyber-criminals in each scenario are unique and require the diverse skills of Section 9's staff to prevent a series of incidents from escalating.
 
In this post-cyberpunk iteration of a possible future, computer technology has advanced to the point that many members of the public possess cyberbrains, technology that allows them to interface their biological brain with various networks. The level of cyberization varies from simple minimal interfaces to almost complete replacement of the brain with cybernetic parts, in cases of severe trauma. This can also be combined with various levels of prostheses, with a fully prosthetic body enabling a person to become a cyborg. The main character of Ghost in the Shell, Major Motoko Kusanagi, is such a cyborg, having had a terrible accident befall her as a child that ultimately required her to use a full-body prosthesis to house her cyberbrain. This high level of cyberization, however, opens the brain up to attacks from highly skilled hackers, with the most dangerous being those who will hack a person to bend to their whims.

Media

Literature

Original manga

The original Ghost in the Shell manga ran in Japan from April 1989 to November 1990 in Kodansha's manga anthology Young Magazine, and was released in a tankōbon volume on October 5, 1991. Ghost in the Shell 2: Man-Machine Interface followed in 1997 for 9 issues in Young Magazine, and was collected in the Ghost in the Shell: Solid Box on December 1, 2000. Four stories from Man-Machine Interface that were not released in tankobon format from previous releases were later collected in Ghost in the Shell 1.5: Human-Error Processor, and published by Kodansha on July 23, 2003. Several art books have also been published for the manga.

Films

Animated films

Two animated films based on the original manga have been released, both directed by Mamoru Oshii and animated by Production I.G. Ghost in the Shell was released in 1995 and follows the "Puppet Master" storyline from the manga. It was re-released in 2008 as Ghost in the Shell 2.0 with new audio and updated 3D computer graphics in certain scenes. Innocence, otherwise known as Ghost in the Shell 2: Innocence, was released in 2004, with its story based on a chapter from the first manga.

On September 5, 2014, it was revealed by Production I.G. that a new Ghost in the Shell animated film,   in Japanese, would be released in 2015 promising to show the "further evolution [of the series]". On January 8, 2015, a short teaser trailer was revealed for the project unveiling a redesigned Major more closely resembling her appearance from the older films, and a plot following the Arise continuity of the franchise. The trailer listed Kazuya Nomura as the director, Kazuchika Kise as the general director and character designer, Toru Okubo as the animation director, Tow Ubukata as the screenplay writer and Cornelius as the composer. The film premiered on June 20, 2015, in Japanese theaters.

Live-action film

In 2008, DreamWorks and producer Steven Spielberg acquired the rights to a live-action film adaptation of the original Ghost in the Shell manga. On January 24, 2014, Rupert Sanders was announced as director, with a screenplay by William Wheeler. In April 2016, the full cast was announced, which included Juliette Binoche, Chin Han, Lasarus Ratuere and Kaori Momoi, and Scarlett Johansson in the lead role; the casting of Johansson drew accusations of whitewashing. Principal photography on the film began on location in Wellington, New Zealand, on February 1, 2016. Filming wrapped in June 2016. Ghost in the Shell premiered in Tokyo on March 16, 2017, and was released in the United States on March 31, 2017, in 2D, 3D and IMAX 3D. It received mixed reviews, with praise for its visuals and Johansson's performance but criticism for its script and grossing a substantive box office.

Television

Stand Alone Complex TV series, film and ONA

In 2002, Ghost in the Shell: Stand Alone Complex premiered on Animax, presenting a new telling of Ghost in the Shell independent from the original manga, focusing on Section 9's investigation of the Laughing Man hacker. It was followed in 2004 by a second season titled Ghost in the Shell: S.A.C. 2nd GIG, which focused on the Individual Eleven terrorist group. The primary storylines of both seasons were compressed into OVAs broadcast as Ghost in the Shell: Stand Alone Complex The Laughing Man in 2005 and Ghost in the Shell: Stand Alone Complex Individual Eleven in 2006. Also in 2006, Ghost in the Shell: Stand Alone Complex - Solid State Society, featuring Section 9's confrontation with a hacker known as the Puppeteer, was broadcast, serving as a finale to the anime series. The extensive score for the series and its films was composed by Yoko Kanno.

Kodansha and Production I.G announced on April 7, 2017 that Kenji Kamiyama and Shinji Aramaki would be co-directing a new Kōkaku Kidōtai anime production. On December 7, 2018, it was reported by Netflix that they had acquired the worldwide streaming rights to the original net animation (ONA) anime series, titled Ghost in the Shell: SAC_2045, and that it would premiere on April 23, 2020. The series will be in 3DCG and Sola Digital Arts will be collaborating with Production I.G on the project. It was later revealed that Ilya Kuvshinov will handle character designs.  It was stated that the new series will have two seasons of 12 episodes each. For the first season, the opening theme song music was “Fly with me” as performed by Daiki Tsuneta, while the ending was “Sustain++” as performed by Mili.

In addition to the anime, a series of published books, two separate manga adaptations, and several video games for consoles and mobile phones have been released for Stand Alone Complex.

Arise OVA, TV series and film

In 2013, a new iteration of the series titled Ghost in the Shell: Arise premiered, taking an original look at the Ghost in the Shell world, set before the original manga. It was released as a series of four original video animation (OVA) episodes (with limited theatrical releases) from 2013 to 2014, then recompiled as a 10-episode television series under the title of Kōkaku Kidōtai: Arise - Alternative Architecture. An additional fifth OVA titled Pyrophoric Cult, originally premiering in the Alternative Architecture broadcast as two original episodes, was released on August 26, 2015. Kazuchika Kise served as the chief director of the series, with Tow Ubukata as head writer. Cornelius was brought onto the project to compose the score for the series, with the Major's new voice actress Maaya Sakamoto also providing vocals for certain tracks.

Ghost in the Shell: The New Movie, also known as Ghost in the Shell: Arise − The Movie or New Ghost in the Shell, is a 2015 film directed by Kazuya Nomura that serves as a finale to the Ghost in the Shell: Arise story arc. The film is a continuation to the plot of the Pyrophoric Cult episode of Arise, and ties up loose ends from that arc.

A manga adaptation was serialized in Kodansha's Young Magazine, which started on March 13 and ended on August 26, 2013.

Video games

Ghost in the Shell was developed by Exact and released for the PlayStation on July 17, 1997, in Japan by Sony Computer Entertainment. It is a third-person shooter featuring an original storyline where the character plays a rookie member of Section 9. The video game's soundtrack Megatech Body features various techno artists, such as Takkyu Ishino, Scan X or Mijk Van Dijk.

Several video games were also developed to tie into the Stand Alone Complex television series, in addition to a first-person shooter by Nexon and Neople titled Ghost in the Shell: Stand Alone Complex - First Assault Online, released in 2016.

Legacy
Ghost in the Shell influenced some prominent filmmakers. The Wachowskis, creators of The Matrix and its sequels, showed it to producer Joel Silver, saying, "We wanna do that for real." The Matrix series took several concepts from the film, including the Matrix digital rain, which was inspired by the opening credits of Ghost in the Shell, and the way characters access the Matrix through holes in the back of their necks. Other parallels have been drawn to James Cameron's Avatar, Steven Spielberg's A.I. Artificial Intelligence, and Jonathan Mostow's Surrogates. James Cameron cited Ghost in the Shell as a source of inspiration, citing it as an influence on Avatar.

Bungie's 2001 third-person action game Oni draws substantial inspiration from Ghost in the Shell setting and characters. Ghost in the Shell also influenced video games such as the Metal Gear Solid series, Deus Ex, and Cyberpunk 2077.

Notes

References

External links

 
 Madman Entertainment's Australian distribution release site 
 

 
Artificial intelligence in fiction
Bandai Namco franchises
Brain–computer interfacing in fiction
Cybernetted society in fiction
Cyberpunk
Cyberpunk anime and manga
Cyborgs in fiction
Existentialist anime and manga
Fiction about consciousness transfer
Fiction about memory erasure and alteration
Fiction about robots
IG Port franchises
Kodansha franchises
Philosophical anime and manga
Post-apocalyptic fiction
Postcyberpunk
Prosthetics in fiction
Transhumanism in fiction